The 1990 California Golden Bears football team was an American football team that represented the University of California, Berkeley in the Pacific-10 Conference (Pac-10) during the 1990 NCAA Division I-A football season. In their fourth year under head coach Bruce Snyder, the Golden Bears compiled a 7–4–1 record (4–3–1 against Pac-10 opponents), finished in fourth place in the Pac-10, and were outscored by their opponents by a combined total of 341 to 325.

The team's statistical leaders included Mike Pawlawski with 2,069 passing yards, Anthony Wallace with 1,002 rushing yards, and Brian Treggs with 564 receiving yards.

Schedule

Game summaries

Miami (FL)

Wyoming (Copper Bowl)

References

California
California Golden Bears football seasons
Guaranteed Rate Bowl champion seasons
California Golden Bears football